Zimbabwe Women Microfinance Bank, whose full name is Zimbabwe Women Microfinance Bank Limited, is a deposit-taking microfinance institution in Zimbabwe. The bank serves those members in the community, who have been un-reached by conventional commercial banks, particularly rural women. Its mission is to empower all women economically and socially.

Location
The bank maintains its headquarters and main branch in the Trust Towers Building, along Samora Machel Avenue in the central business district of Harare, the capital and largest city of Zimbabwe. The geographical coordinates of the bank's headquarters are:17°49'37.0"S, 31°02'47.0"E (Latitude:-17.826944; Longitude:31.046389).

Overview
As of June 2018, the bank's assets were valued at US$10 million, all of it being shareholders' equity. A that time the bank maintained one branch, in downtown Harare. Media reports indicate that it is the first Women's bank in Southern Africa. While serving customers regardless of gender, the bank focuses on delivering services to women, specially rural women with emphasis on the previously un-banked. Services offered include savings accounts with low opening deposits, group accounts, availability in rural areas, lending to micro, small and medium enterprises and provision of financial literacy classes. During the first ninety days, the bank opened nearly 9,000 client accounts.

History
After a period of planning, the Reserve Bank of Zimbabwe granted a microfinance banking license to Zimbabwe Women Microfinance Bank Limited to commence operations on 29 May 2018. The bank commenced banking services on Tuesday 12 June 2018.

Ownership
The company is 100 percent owned by the Zimbabwean government, through the Zimbabwe Ministry of Women's Affairs, Gender and Community Development.

See also

 Banking in Uganda
 List of banks in Uganda

References

External links
 Website of the Reserve Bank of Zimbabwe
 President opens women’s bank . . . lasting solution to cash shortages underway As of 26 June 2018.

Banks of Zimbabwe
Companies based in Harare
Banks established in 2018
2018 establishments in Zimbabwe
Government-owned companies of Zimbabwe